Amphicnaeia nigra is a species of beetle in the family Cerambycidae. It was described by Galileo and Martins in 2001.

References

nigra
Beetles described in 2001